Paweł Łukasz Brożek (born 21 April 1983) is a Polish former professional footballer who played as a striker. Brozek previously represented various youth squads for Poland. He made his Poland national football team debut in 2005, scored over 30 international appearances and competed at the 2006 FIFA World Cup and UEFA Euro 2012.

Club career

Early career
Paweł Brożek was born in Kielce. In 1992 he began his career at Polonia Białogon Kielce, together with his twin brother Piotr. In 1998, he moved to Zabrze to play for SMS Zabrze. A half a year later he joined Wisła Kraków, together with his brother.

Wisła Kraków
He made his debut for Wisła Kraków in Ekstraklasa on 8 April 2001 in a match against Górnik Zabrze. On 21 April 2001, he scored his first goal in the Ekstraklasa in a match against Odra Wodzisław. In May 2001 Brożek signed a new 10-year contract with Wisła Kraków. He won the Ekstraklasa championship in 2000–01 season with Wisła Kraków. In 2002, he was loaned to ŁKS Łódź to play in the Polish First League. A half year later he returned to Wisła Kraków and won with his second club Ekstraklasa title, in 2002–03 season. In 2004, he was loaned to GKS Katowice for a year and a half. He was a stand out player at GKS Katowice. In December 2004 he was invited for a trial together with his twin brother Piotr by West Ham United.

In January 2005 Paweł Brożek returned to Wisła Kraków, because the then Wisła manager Werner Lička wanted him to come back from loan. Brożek won the Ekstraklasa title in 2004–05 season with Wisła Kraków. In 2005–06 season he began to play regularly for the Wisła Kraków first squad. Subsequently, he scored 13 goals in 30 matches. In 2006–07 season Brożek played very well in UEFA Cup, where he scored 4 goals in group stage matches against AS Nancy, FC Basel and Feyenoord Rotterdam. In 2007–08 season Brożek scored 23 goals in 27 matches and led Wisła Kraków to achieve the Ekstraklasa title. He was the Ekstraklasa Top Goalscorer in 2007–08 season. In 2008–09 season he won his sixth Ekstraklasa title with Wisła and was the Ekstraklasa Top Goalscorer for the second time in a row. In the following 2009–10 season, Brożek led his team in goals and assists while Wisła finished second in the league.

Trabzonspor
In January 2011, Paweł together with his twin brother Piotr, joined Turkish Süper Lig side Trabzonspor on a -year deal for an undisclosed fee from Wisła Kraków. Brożek made his debut for Trabzonspor in a Turkish Cup match against Beşiktaş on 26 January 2011, assisting Alanzinho's goal with a back-heel pass. In the 2010–11 Süper Lig season, he contributed with two goals and two assists for the eventual runners-up. In the following campaign, Brożek could not establish himself in the Trabzonspor starting line-up, blocked by Turkish international Burak Yılmaz, who played as the sole striker in the system preferred by coach Şenol Güneş.

Loan to Celtic
On 29 January 2012, Brożek agreed terms to join Scottish Premier League outfit Celtic on loan from Trabzonspor until the end of the season, subject to a medical. The following day, he signed a contract with Celtic after passing the medical exams. He was given the number 17 shirt. On 8 February 2012, he made his debut in the 4–0 win over Heart of Midlothian in a Scottish Premier League match, coming on as a second-half substitute for Scott Brown. He made three appearances in total for the eventual league champions, failing to score in any of them. At the end of his loan spell at Celtic, Brożek criticised Neil Lennon, stating that the Celtic manager "...promised me something and then another thing happened afterwards. I did not get many opportunities from him and I was left dry of games."

Recreativo de Huelva
In August 2012, Brożek joined Spanish second-tier club Recreativo de Huelva. Brożek did not play regularly and the team were nowhere near achieving promotion, eventually finishing in thirteenth place with Brożek scoring only twice in 18 league appearances. In June 2013, it was reported Brożek was leaving Recreativo.

Wisła Kraków
On 23 July 2013, it was reported that Brożek was undergoing medical tests with Wisła Kraków with a view to rejoining his previous club. Contract negotiations involved the player agreeing to lower his wages, but receive increased bonuses for wins and goals. A week later, Brożek's signing was confirmed.

On 3 May 2014, he scored a hat-trick against Pogoń Szczecin and also his 100th goal in Ekstraklasa, it took 227 appearances to achieve that.

Brożek retired from playing after the 2019–20 season.

International career

In 1999, he played at the FIFA U-17 World Championship tournament. In 2000 Brożek played at the UEFA European Under-16 Football Championship tournament. With Poland national under-17 football team Brożek won Vaclav Jezek Tournament in 2000 and was Top Goalscorer of the tournament with 6 goals. In 2001, he won UEFA European Under-18 Football Championship with Poland national under-18 football team. He played in first squad in all matches at the tournament. He was the youngest member of the team. All other u-18 team members were born in 1982, while Brożek was born in 1983. He showed a great performance in UEFA European Under-21 Championship 2004–2006 qualifying round where he scored 9 goals in 8 matches he played.

Brożek made his first appearance for the Poland national football team against Mexico in 2005, scoring in the process. He was selected to the 23-man national squad for the 2006 FIFA World Cup finals held in Germany, where, coming on as a substitute he nearly scored a goal against Ecuador in their 2–0 defeat, with a left foot shot that hit the post.

In May 2012, he was called up to the 23-man Poland national football team for UEFA Euro 2012. At the tournament, Brożek played in two group stage matches. Although he has not retired from international football, he has not appeared for the side since 2014.

Personal life
His twin brother, Piotr, is also a former footballer.

Career statistics

1 All appearances in Ekstraklasa Cup.
2 All appearances in Polish SuperCup.

International

International goals
Scores and results list Poland's goal tally first, score column indicates score after each Brożek goal.

Honours

Club
Wisła Kraków U-19
Polish U-19 Championship: 2000

Wisła Kraków
Ekstraklasa: 2000–01, 2002–03, 2003–04, 2004–05, 2007–08, 2008–09, 2010–11
Polish Cup: 2001–02, 2002–03
Ekstraklasa Cup: 2000–01
Polish SuperCup: 2001

International
Poland
UEFA U-18 Championship: 2001

Individual
Ekstraklasa top scorer: 2007–08, 2008–09
Polish Domestic Best Player: 2008
 Ekstraklasa Footballer of the Season: 2008–09

References

External links

 
 National team stats on the website of the Polish Football Association 
 

1983 births
Living people
Sportspeople from Kielce
Association football forwards
Polish footballers
Poland international footballers
Poland under-21 international footballers
Poland youth international footballers
Polish expatriate footballers
Wisła Kraków players
ŁKS Łódź players
GKS Katowice players
Trabzonspor footballers
Celtic F.C. players
Recreativo de Huelva players
2006 FIFA World Cup players
UEFA Euro 2012 players
Ekstraklasa players
Süper Lig players
Scottish Premier League players
Segunda División players
Expatriate footballers in Turkey
Expatriate footballers in Scotland
Expatriate footballers in Spain
Polish expatriate sportspeople in Turkey
Polish twins
Twin sportspeople